{{Infobox building
|name               = Crawford House
|image              = 1877 ScollaySquare BostonianSociety.png
|image_size         = 250px
|caption            = The Crawford House (center, with window awnings), 1877
|opened_date        = 1865
|renovation_date    = 18741926
|building_type      = Hotel
|location           = 81-85 Court Street, 9-17 Brattle StreetBoston, MassachusettsUnited States
|coordinates        = 
|map_type           = Boston
|antenna_spire      = 
|roof               = 
|top_floor          = 
|diameter           = 
|floor_count        = 6
|floor_area         = 
|rooms              = 100 (approx.)
|demolition_date    = 1950 (Hotel)1962 (Theater)
|architect          = Joseph R. Richards
|references         = <ref name="Vrabel">Vrabel, Jim. 'When in Boston: A Time Line & Almanac.".'' Boston: Northeastern University Press, 2004. . p. 181.</ref>City of Boston. Office of the Board of Fire Commissioners. "Fire Commissioners Report." Documents of the City of Boston, For the Year 1875, Volume III. Boston: Rockwell and Churchill, 1876. p. 226.
}}

The Crawford House''' was a hotel and restaurant in downtown Boston, Massachusetts. Located on Court and Brattle Streets in Scollay Square, it was in operation during the late nineteenth and early twentieth centuries, and was for a time among the leading hotels in the city. The building was demolished in 1962 as part of the Government Center project.

History
The Crawford House was originally opened in December 1865, as a café on Brattle Street. In 1873 the owners decided to build a new hotel on the premises and undertook a substantial expansion of the building, adding several stories and extending it west to Court Street. The hotel was completed in the following year and opened on March 10, 1874. It was further enlarged around 1886, when it merged with the nearby Carelton House on Hanover Street. Following the merger, the Crawford had a capacity of 450 guests.

In 1926, the portion of the Crawford House facing Court Street was seized by the city via eminent domain in order to widen Cambridge and Court Streets, and the front wall on that side was torn down. As a result, the hotel temporarily closed on April 17, 1926. The remaining part of the building was subsequently taken over by new management and underwent a period of remodeling. The hotel reopened on December 4, at which time the upper floors had approximately 100 guest rooms. The ground floor was occupied by a theater, which opened soon after.

During the 1930s and 1940s, the Crawford House theater was considered a landmark of Scollay Square; it served as a venue for numerous local dancers, musicians and comedians. It gained particular fame during this period as the home of Sally Keith, a prominent burlesque performer in the city.

The Crawford House hotel was permanently closed after the building was damaged by a fire on March 23, 1948. In January 1950 the third through sixth floors of the hotel were demolished, but the first and second floors were retained and the theater was kept open. The truncated building remained in operation until the early 1960s, when the city cleared the Scollay Square area to make way for the new City Hall Plaza.

References

Images

External links
 Crawford House, 1910 - Shorpy
 Photo of Crawford House fire, 1948 - Boston Public Library
 Crawford House Theatrical Bar, late 1950s - MIT Libraries

Demolished buildings and structures in Boston
19th century in Boston
Hotels in Boston
Government Center, Boston
Demolished hotels in the United States
Buildings and structures demolished in 1962